William Archibald Strang (18 October 1906 – 13 February 1989) was a New Zealand rugby union player. A first five-eighth and halfback, Strang represented  at a provincial level, and was a member of the New Zealand national side, the All Blacks, from 1928 to 1931. He played 17 matches for the All Blacks including five internationals, and captained the side in his final Test match, against Australia in 1931.

Strang served with the 2nd New Zealand Expeditionary Force (NZEF) in World War II. He later served on the South Canterbury Rugby Union, and as selector–coach for the Tauranga sub-union. He died in Tauranga on 13 February 1989, and his ashes were buried at Pyes Pa Cemetery.

References

1906 births
1989 deaths
Rugby union players from Invercargill
New Zealand rugby union players
New Zealand international rugby union players
South Canterbury rugby union players
Rugby union scrum-halves
Rugby union fly-halves
New Zealand sports executives and administrators
New Zealand rugby union coaches
Burials at Pyes Pa Cemetery